Barry Pugh (17 October 1984) is a former professional rugby league footballer who played in the 2000s and 2010s.

International honours
Barry Pugh won caps for Wales while at Barrow Raiders 2004(…2005?) 2-caps.

References

External links
Lennon answers distant Wales call
Search for "Barry Pugh" AND "Rugby League" at BBC – Sport

1984 births
Living people
Barrow Raiders players
English people of Welsh descent
English rugby league players
Place of birth missing (living people)
Rugby league locks
Wales national rugby league team players